"Stealth" is the eleventh episode of the second season of the American television drama series The Americans, and the 24th overall episode of the series. It originally aired on FX in the United States on May 7, 2014.

Plot
In the research facility in Russia, a cooperative but resentful Anton (Michael Aronov) tells Vasili (Peter Von Berg) that he needs two things to continue developing stealth technology: details of the radar-absorbent material used by the Americans, and a computer system called Echo that will allow him to test designs. To get the former, Philip befriends former engineer John Skeevers (Željko Ivanek), who is dying of cancer and believes he was poisoned by his former employers.  He learns that the material is a paint containing tiny iron balls and is possibly poisonous.

Philip learns from his bug that the FBI now know that Emmet and Leanne were KGB operatives.  Elizabeth visits Jared in her social worker persona, and learns that the FBI has visited him and shown him their pictures, though Jared does not appear to have recognized her yet.  She then follows Jared to where he meets with an undisguised Kate.  Before she can ask Kate about this, Larrick attacks, overpowers, interrogates, and kills Kate at her house, after figuring out how to decode her radio signals from The centre.  When she does not report, The Centre sends Philip and Elizabeth to Kate's house to investigate, where they find a hidden, encoded note that Kate left telling them to, "Get Jared Out."

Arkady (Lev Gorn) and Oleg (Costa Ronin), after hearing about Stan's marital problem, decide that it is time to finally turn him to get the rest of the key ingredients for stealth technology. Arkady tells Oleg that Nina will be returned to Moscow and tried for treason if this fails, hinting that Oleg's influence might be able to help her; Oleg tells Nina this as well. Nina tells Stan she fears for her life and sees no way out, and Stan promises to protect her whatever the cost. At home, Sandra has made up her mind to leave the house, and they discuss possibilities about their future, but neither of them know what they want.

Philip suggests that Paige be allowed to go to the summer camp.  Elizabeth refuses but later allows Paige to go on a church trip to protest American nuclear weapons, recognizing echoes of her own idealism. Henry interviews Stan as a "hero" for a school project.

Production
The episode was written by Joshua Brand and directed by Gregory Hoblit.

Reception
The episode was watched by 1.12 million viewers and scored 0.3 ratings in 18–49 demographics, as per Nielsen ratings. The critics' review of the episode were positive. The A.V. Club gave the episode a 'B+', saying the episode serves well to set up the last two episodes of the season. Alan Sepinwall from Hitfix reviewed the episode positively.

References

External links
 "Stealth" at FX
 

The Americans (season 2) episodes
2014 American television episodes